Mörrums GoIS IK is an ice hockey club in Sweden. They play in one of the six Division 1-series in Sweden.

Ice hockey teams in Sweden
Ice hockey teams in Blekinge County